Justin Timmermans (born 25 September 1996) is a Dutch former racing cyclist, who rode professionally between 2016 and 2020 for the , ,  and the . He rode in the 2019 Paris–Roubaix, but did not finish.

Major results
2017
 8th Slag om Norg

References

External links

1996 births
Living people
Dutch male cyclists
People from Hardenberg
Cyclists from Overijssel
21st-century Dutch people